Aaron Paul is an American actor. The following are his roles in film, television series, audio, and music videos.

Film

Television

Audio

Music videos

References

American filmographies
Male actor filmographies